Looe Lifeboat Station is the base for Royal National Lifeboat Institution (RNLI) search and rescue operations at Looe, Cornwall in the United Kingdom.

History
To the east of Looe is the expanse of Whitsand Bay. While attempting to run for the safety of Plymouth Sound many sailing ships became embayed, unable to sail around Rame Head. Wrecks were frequent and Looe men made many rescues before the lifeboat station was established. In 1824, John Miller received the RNLI Silver Medal, and three others, monetary awards for rescuing seven men from Harmonie, wrecked in Whitsand Bay. Ten years later, in 1834, monetary awards and a Silver Medal was awarded for saving twelve crew from the Konigberg. A third Silver Medal was awarded in November 1838 to William Jennings who swam to the brig Belissima, carrying a line, and saving thirteen men. Rescuing the crew of the Fletan resulted in a fourth silver medal in February 1851.

A lifeboat house was erected in 1866 and the first lifeboat, Oxfordshire was paraded through the streets on 28 December 1866 and named by Mrs W H Carew. The RNLI withdrew services from Looe in 1930 on the grounds that the lifeboats of Fowey and Plymouth could cover the area.

From 1991 the RNLI stationed a lifeboat at Looe for the summer season and three years later the Spirit of the ROAC was housed in a temporary lifeboat house, provided by the East Looe Town Trust. A new lifeboat station was built on the old Albatross warehouse site on the quay, construction starting in Autumn 2002.

Former lifeboats
'ON' is the RNLI's sequential Official Number; 'Op. No.' is the operational number painted onto the boat.

Pulling and sailing lifeboats

Current lifeboats

Inshore lifeboats

See also

 List of RNLI stations

Notes

Sources

External links

 Official station website
 RNLI station information

Buildings and structures in Cornwall
Lifeboat stations in Cornwall
Looe